The 1921–22 season was Blackpool F.C.'s 21st season (eighteenth consecutive) in the Football League. They competed in the 22-team Division Two, then the second tier of English football, finishing nineteenth.

Harry Bedford was the club's top scorer, with twelve goals (eleven in the league and one in the FA Cup).

Season synopsis
An opening-day victory, at home to Derby County, was the only time maximum points were achieved for the next eleven outings, a sequence that saw ten defeats and one draw. By the halfway point, Blackpool only had eleven points to their name.

A markedly-improved second half kept their heads just above water as they finished just two points above the relegation spots.

Any hope of an FA Cup run was ended in the first round by Watford.

Table

Transfers

In

Out

References

Blackpool F.C.
Blackpool F.C. seasons